The 34th Annual Grammy Awards were held on February 25, 1992, recognizing accomplishments by musicians from the previous year (1991). Natalie Cole won the most awards (three), including Album of the Year. Paul Simon opened the show.

Performers

Presenters
 Vanessa L. Williams & Michael Bolton - Song of the Year
 Dionne Warwick & Johnny Mathis - Record of the Year
 Kenny Rogers & Whoopi Goldberg - Album of the Year
 Andrew Strong & Robert Arkins of The Commitments - Best New Artist
 Clint Black & Roy Rogers - Best Female Country Vocal Performance
 Tanya Tucker & Chet Atkins - Best Male Country Vocal Performance
 Willie Nelson & Ringo Starr - Best Female Pop Vocal Performance
 Curtis Stigers & Jody Watley - Best Male Pop Vocal Performance
 Little Steven & Robbie Robertson - Best Metal Performance
 Henry Mancini - Best Jazz Instrumental Performance, Group
 Juan Luis Guerra & Celine Dion - Best Pop Performance by a Duo or Group with Vocals
 Boyz II Men & Color Me Badd - Best Rap Performance by a Duo or Group
 Kenny Loggins & David Crosby - Best Female & Male R&B Vocal Performance

Award winners
Record of the Year
David Foster (producer) for "Unforgettable" performed by Natalie Cole with Nat King Cole
Album of the Year
Unforgettable... with Love – Natalie Cole (André Fischer, David Foster & Tommy LiPuma; producers)

Song of the Year
Irving Gordon (songwriter) for "Unforgettable" performed by Natalie Cole with Nat King Cole
Best New Artist
Marc Cohn

Alternative
Best Alternative Music Album
R.E.M. for Out of Time

Blues
Best Traditional Blues Album
B.B. King for Live at the Apollo 
Best Contemporary Blues Album
Buddy Guy for Damn Right, I've Got the Blues

Children's
Best Album for Children
Clifford "Barney" Robertson (producer) for A Capella Kids performed by The Maranatha! Kids

Classical
Best Orchestral Performance
Daniel Barenboim (conductor) & the Chicago Symphony Orchestra for Corigliano: Symphony No. 1
Best Classical Vocal Soloist
Dawn Upshaw for The Girl With Orange Lips (Falla, Ravel, etc.)
Best Opera Recording
Cord Garben (producer), James Levine (conductor), Hildegard Behrens, Reiner Goldberg, Matti Salminen, Hanna Schwarz, Cheryl Studer, Bernd Weikl, Ekkehard Wlaschiha, & the Metropolitan Opera Orchestra for Wagner: Götterdämmerung
Best Performance of a Choral Work
Georg Solti (conductor), Margaret Hillis (choir director) & the Chicago Symphony Orchestra & Chorus for Bach: Mass in B Minor
Best Instrumental Soloist With Orchestra
Leonard Slatkin (conductor), John Browning & the Saint Louis Symphony Orchestra for Barber: Piano Concerto  
Best Classical Performance Instrumental Solo Without Orchestra
Alicia de Larrocha for Granados: Goyescas; Allegro de Concierto; Danza Lenta
Best Chamber Music Performance
Emanuel Ax, Jaime Laredo, Yo-Yo Ma & Isaac Stern for Brahms: Piano Quartets (Opp. 25 and 26)
Best Contemporary Composition
John Corigliano (composer), Daniel Barenboim (conductor) & the Chicago Symphony Orchestra for Corigliano: Symphony No. 1  
Best Classical Album
Hans Weber (producer), Leonard Bernstein (conductor), June Anderson, Nicolai Gedda, Adolph Green, Jerry Hadley, Della Jones, Christa Ludwig, Kurt Ollmann & the London Symphony Orchestra for Bernstein: Candide

Comedy
Best Comedy Album
Peter Schickele for P.D.Q. Bach: WTWP Classical Talkity-Talk Radio

Composing and arranging
Best Instrumental Composition
Elton John (composer) for "Basque" performed by James Galway        
Best Song Written Specifically for a Motion Picture or Television
Bryan Adams, Michael Kamen & Robert John "Mutt" Lange (songwriters) for "(Everything I Do) I Do It for You" performed by Bryan Adams  
Best Instrumental Composition Written for a Motion Picture or for Television
John Barry (composer) for Dances With Wolves  
Best Arrangement on an Instrumental
Dave Grusin (arranger) for "Medley: Bess You Is My Woman/I Loves You Porgy"
Best Instrumental Arrangement Accompanying Vocal(s)
Johnny Mandel (arranger) for "Unforgettable" performed by Natalie Cole with Nat King Cole

Country
Best Country Vocal Performance, Female
Mary Chapin Carpenter for "Down at the Twist and Shout"
Best Country Vocal Performance, Male
Garth Brooks for Ropin' the Wind  
Best Country Performance by a Duo or Group with Vocal
The Judds for "Love Can Build a Bridge"
Best Country Vocal Collaboration
Vince Gill, Ricky Skaggs & Steve Wariner for "Restless"
Best Country Instrumental Performance
Mark O'Connor for The New Nashville Cats  
Best Country Song
John Jarvis, Naomi Judd & Paul Overstreet (songwriters) for "Love Can Build a Bridge" performed by The Judds  
Best Bluegrass Album
Carl Jackson & John Starling for Spring Training

Folk
Best Traditional Folk Album
Ken Burns & John Colby (producers) for The Civil War - Original Soundtrack performed by various artists  
Best Contemporary Folk Album
John Prine for The Missing Years

Gospel
Best Pop Gospel Album
Steven Curtis Chapman for For the Sake of the Call
Best Rock/Contemporary Gospel Album
Russ Taff for Under Their Influence
Best Traditional Soul Gospel Album
Mighty Clouds of Joy for Pray For Me
Best Contemporary Soul Gospel Album
BeBe Winans & CeCe Winans for Different Lifestyles 
Best Southern Gospel Album
The Gaither Vocal Band for Homecoming
Best Gospel Album by Choir or Chorus
Gary Hines (choir director) for The Evolution of Gospel performed by The Sounds of Blackness

Historical
Best Historical Album
Steven Lasker & Andy McKaie (producers) for Billie Holiday - The Complete Decca Recordings

Jazz
Best Jazz Instrumental Solo
Stan Getz for "I Remember You"
Best Jazz Instrumental Performance, Group
The Oscar Peterson Trio for Saturday Night at the Blue Note
Best Large Jazz Ensemble Performance
Dizzy Gillespie for Live at the Royal Festival Hall
Best Jazz Vocal Performance
Take 6 for He Is Christmas
Best Contemporary Jazz Performance
The Manhattan Transfer for "Sassy"

Latin
Best Latin Pop Album
Vikki Carr for Cosas del Amor  
Best Tropical Latin Album
Juan Luis Guerra for Bachata Rosa  
Best Mexican-American Album
Little Joe for 16 de Septiembre

Musical show
Best Musical Show Album
Cy Coleman (producer and composer), Mike Berniker (producer), Adolph Green, Betty Comden (lyricists) & the original Broadway cast for The Will Rogers Follies

Music video
Best Music Video, Short Form
Tarsem (video director) & R.E.M. for "Losing My Religion"
Best Music Video, Long Form
Anthony Eaton (video producer), David Mallet, Mark "Aldo" Miceli (video directors) & Madonna for Madonna:  Blond Ambition World Tour Live

New Age
Best New Age Album
Chip Davis for Fresh Aire 7

Packaging and notes
Best Album Package
Vartan (art director) for Billie Holiday - The Complete Decca Recordings  performed by Billie Holiday 
Best Album Notes
Alan M. Leeds, Cliff White, Harry Weinger, James Brown & Nelson George (notes writers) for Star Time performed by James Brown

Polka
Best Polka Album
Jimmy Sturr for Live at Gilley's!

Pop
Best Pop Vocal Performance, Female
Bonnie Raitt for "Something to Talk About"

Best Pop Vocal Performance, Male
Michael Bolton for "When a Man Loves a Woman"

Best Pop Performance by a Duo or Group with Vocal
R.E.M. for "Losing My Religion"

Best Pop Instrumental Performance
Michael Kamen for Robin Hood: Prince of Thieves

Production and engineering
Best Engineered Album, Non-Classical
Al Schmitt, Armin Steiner, David Reitzas & Woody Woodruff (engineers) for Unforgettable... with Love performed by Natalie Cole with Nat King Cole
Best Classical Engineered Album
Gregor Zielinsky (engineer), Leonard Bernstein (conductor) & the London Symphony Orchestra for Bernstein: Candide  
Producer of the Year, (Non Classical)
David Foster
Classical Producer of the Year
James Mallinson

R&B
Best R&B Vocal Performance, Female
Lisa Fischer for "How Can I Ease the Pain"
Patti LaBelle for [[Burnin' (Patti LaBelle album)#Track listing|Burnin''']]
Best R&B Vocal Performance, Male
Luther Vandross for Power of LoveBest R&B Performance by a Duo or Group with Vocal
Boyz II Men for Cooleyhighharmony
Best Rhythm & Blues Song
Marcus Miller, Luther Vandross & Teddy Vann (songwriters) for "Power of Love/Love Power" performed by Luther Vandross

Rap
Best Rap Solo Performance
LL Cool J for "Mama Said Knock You Out"
Best Rap Performance by a Duo or Group
DJ Jazzy Jeff & The Fresh Prince for "Summertime"

Reggae
Best Reggae Album
Shabba Ranks for As Raw as EverRock
Best Rock Vocal Performance, Solo
Bonnie Raitt for Luck of the DrawBest Rock Performance by a Duo or Group with Vocal
Bonnie Raitt & Delbert McClinton for Good Man, Good WomanBest Rock Instrumental Performance
Eric Johnson for "Cliffs of Dover"
Best Hard Rock Performance with Vocal
Van Halen for "For Unlawful Carnal Knowledge"  
Best Metal Performance with Vocal
Metallica for MetallicaBest Rock Song
Sting (songwriter) for "The Soul Cages"

Spoken
Best Spoken Word or Non-musical Album
Ken Burns for The Civil WarTraditional pop
Best Traditional Pop Performance
Natalie Cole for Unforgettable... with LoveWorld
Best World Music Album
Mickey Hart for Planet Drum''

Special merit awards

MusiCares Person of the Year
Bonnie Raitt

Grammy Legend Award
Barbra Streisand

Trivia
Lisa Fischer and Patti LaBelle tied in the category of Best Female R&B Vocal Performance; therefore both won awards.

References

 034
1992 in New York City
1992 music awards
Radio City Music Hall
1992 in American music
Grammy
February 1992 events in the United States